Marko Seufatu Nikola Stamenic (born 19 February 2002) is a New Zealand professional footballer who plays as a midfielder for Danish Superliga club F.C. Copenhagen and the New Zealand national team. From July 1, 2023, Stamenic will play for Red Star Belgrade.

Club career

Western Suburbs
Born in Wellington, Stamenic attended St Patrick's college, Silverstream, Wellington. and came through the ranks of the Olé Football Academy. During this time, Stamenic played for Olé-affiliated club Western Suburbs in the Central Premier League, making his debut in 2017 and reaching the final of the 2018 Chatham Cup.

Team Wellington
Following Olé's affiliation with ISPS Handa Premiership side Team Wellington, Stamenic signed for them on 2 October 2019. He made seven league appearances, scoring one goal on 15 December 2019 against Southern United.

Copenhagen
Following his standout performances for New Zealand in the 2019 FIFA U-17 World Cup, Stamenic was invited for a three-week trial at Danish Superliga side FC Copenhagen in March 2020. However, following an order from the New Zealand Government for all foreign-based New Zealand citizens to urgently return to the country in response to the COVID-19 pandemic, he was forced to abort the trial. FC Copenhagen retained their interest, and Stamenic eventually returned to Denmark, signing for the club's under-19 team on 1 September 2020.

Stamenic made his debut for the first team on 23 November 2020, starting in a 2–1 Superliga loss to Randers FC.

On 9 January 2023, Copenhagen announced they would not be extending his contract, which expires in June 2023.

Career statistics

Club

International career

Under-17
Stamenic made his first appearance for the New Zealand U-17 team coming off the bench in their 0–5 loss to the Solomon Islands at the 2018 OFC U-16 Championship. He then followed that up starting in New Zealand's next matches against Papua New Guinea in the last pool game, Tahiti in the semi-finals and in the final which saw a rematch against the Solomon Islands that New Zealand won 5–4 on penalties.

Stamenic played all three games for New Zealand in their 2019 FIFA U-17 World Cup campaign, finishing third in their group.

Senior
Stamenic made his international debut with the senior New Zealand national team in a 2–1 friendly win over Curaçao on 9 October 2021.

Personal life
Born in New Zealand, Stamenic is of Serbian and Samoan descent.

Honours
Western Suburbs
Central League: 2017, 2019
Chatham Cup runner-up: 2018

References

External links

Living people
2002 births
New Zealand association footballers
New Zealand international footballers
New Zealand youth international footballers
New Zealand people of Serbian descent
New Zealand sportspeople of Samoan descent
Association football midfielders
New Zealand expatriate association footballers
People educated at St. Patrick's College, Wellington
Footballers at the 2020 Summer Olympics
Olympic association footballers of New Zealand
F.C. Copenhagen players
HB Køge players
Danish 1st Division players
Western Suburbs FC (New Zealand) players
Team Wellington players
New Zealand expatriate sportspeople in Denmark
Expatriate men's footballers in Denmark
New Zealand under-23 international footballers